Whitehaven once again competed in the National League One in the 2006 Season after falling to defeat at the hands of the Castleford Tigers in the 2005 grand final for a second successive season. They were led by new coash Dave Rotheram who replaced the outgoing Steve McCormack, who took up the head coaching role at newly relegated Widnes Vikings. Throughout much of the season, the club were plagued by injury problems which hindered their attempts to reach a third successive final and finally achieve promotion with at one point 15 first team players being unavailable for selection. Nevertheless, they did mount a late challenge led by new scrum half John Duffy aided by the likes of Steve Trindall and Gary Broadbent before ultimately falling short.

Squad

League results

Playoffs 

Northern Rail Cup 

Playoffs

References

Whitehaven R.L.F.C.
2006 in rugby league by club
English rugby league club seasons